The Hand of the Violinist (The Rhythms of the Bow) is a 1912 painting by Italian Futurist Giacomo Balla, depicting a musician's hand and the neck of a violin "made to look like it's vibrating through space"—blurred and duplicated to suggest the motion of frenetic playing. The painting, representative of Futurism's first wave, exhibits techniques of Divisionism.

Balla was inspired to use multiplication to imply motion by the photographic experiments of Eadweard Muybridge and Étienne-Jules Marey. As with other Futurists, he was also inspired by Cubism's methods of capturing multiple perspectives; The Hand of the Violinist has been said to bring the viewer "inside the reverberations of the instrument itself", and has earned comparison with Marcel Duchamp's Nude Descending a Staircase.

From February to August 2014, the painting was part of the exhibit Italian Futurism, 1909–1944: Reconstructing the Universe, at the Guggenheim in New York.

References

Works by Giacomo Balla
Futurist paintings
1912 paintings
Paintings of people
Paintings in the collection of the Solomon R. Guggenheim Museum
Musical instruments in art